Canari may refer to:

Canari, Haute-Corse, a commune in France
River Canari, in Dominica
Cañari, an ethnic group in Ecuador

See also
Canari noir, a red wine grape
Canaris (disambiguation)
Canary (disambiguation)